The San Jose Matulid Chapel is an undated Roman Catholic chapel found at Barangay San Jose Matulid, Mexico, Pampanga, Philippines. It is believed to be the first church of the town before the Augustinian Friars transferred to the present-day townsite of Mexico, Pampanga or now known as Barangay Parian.

History
The San Jose Matulid chapel, located southwest of the town center at Barangay San Jose Matulid, is believed to be the oldest chapel of its kind in the entire Pampanga province. Its site is also believed to be the first settlement established by the missionary friars upon their arrival into the area before transferring to its present site at Barangay Parian due to the constant flooding of the a nearby creek called Sapang Matulid. No available records tell of the exact date of construction of the chapel.

Architecture
The chapel’s façade is adorned by couples of Tuscan pillars reaching into its apex.  The central portion then expands horizontally with two unadorned walls with semicircular arch windows. The façade is topped by a wood and galvanized iron belfry. One of its two bells was reportedly stolen.  Notable features of the chapel’s interior are the ceiling art located above the main altar.

See also
Mexico, Pampanga
Pio Chapel

References

Spanish Colonial architecture in the Philippines